Richard Snodgrass may refer to:
 Richard T. Snodgrass, American computer scientist and writer
 Richard Bruce Snodgrass, American writer and photographer